The Nyanzapithecinae or Nyanzapithecines are a subfamily of extinct Dendropithecidae as sister of Simiolus. The group contains Rangwapithecus, Turkanapithecus, Rukwapithecus, Oreopithecus, and Nyanzapithecus. In the following tree the internal structure of Nyanzapithecinae of Nengo et al. is followed.
Nyanzapithecinae Harrison, 2002

 Nyanzapithecus Harrison, 1986
 Nyanzapithecus harrisoni Kunimatsu, 1997
 Nyanzapithecus pickfordi Harrison, 1986
 Nyanzapithecus vancouveringorum Andrews, 1974
 Mabokopithecus von Koenigswald, 1969
 Mabokopithecus clarki von Koenigswald, 1969
 Rangwapithecus Andrews, 1974
 Rangwapithecus gordoni Andrews, 1974
 Turkanapithecus Leakey & Leakey, 1986
 Turkanapithecus kalakolensis Leakey & Leakey, 1986
Nengo et al. suggest: "Nyanzapithecines were a long-lived and diverse group of Miocene hominoids that are probably close to the origin of crown hominoids."

References

Miocene primates of Africa